Laure Watrin is a French journalist and author. She is the co-author with Layla Demay of the book series Les Pintades. She is the co-host of the TV series Les Pintades, aired as part of the TV show Les Nouveaux Explorateurs, broadcast on Canal Plus.

Biography 
Laure Watrin was born in Nancy, France, in 1971. She is a graduate of Institut d’Etudes Politiques de Paris often referred to as Sciences Po and Centre de Formation des Journalistes.

She worked in France as a reporter and a medical correspondent for RTL (French radio), for 12 years. 
She started her career as book series editor and author in 2004 with the publication of travel guide book Pintades in New York.

She is a guest contributor for French and European TV channels.

Bibliography 

Pintades in New York  (Les Pintades à New York)
New York for Pintades  (Le New York des Pintades)
Pintades in London  (Les Pintades à Londres)
Pintades in Teheran  (Les Pintades à Téhéran)
Pintades in Paris  (Une vie de Pintade à Paris)
Pintades in Beyrouth  (Une vie de Pintade à Beyrouth)
Pintades cook book  (Les Pintades passent à la casserole)
Pintade in Berlin  (Une vie de Pintade à Berlin)
Pintades in Madrid  (Une vie de Pintade à Madrid)
Pintades in Moscow (Une vie de Pintade à Moscou)

Filmography 

Pintades in London (Les Pintades à Londres), presented by Maïtena Biraben for the tv show Les Nouveaux Explorateurs. Directed by Stéphane Carrel, authors/hosts Layla Demay and Laure Watrin. Producer: Capa TV[8]. Length : 28'50. Date : 2007.
Pintades in Rio (Les Pintades à Rio), presented by Maïtena Biraben for the tv show Les Nouveaux Explorateurs. Directed by Stéphane Carrel, authors/hosts Layla Demay and Laure Watrin. Producer: CapaTV[10]. Length: 53'31. Date: 2008.
Pintades in New York (Les Pintades à New York), presented by Diego Buñuel for the tv show Les Nouveaux Explorateurs.Directed by Jean-Marie Barrère, authors/hosts  Layla Demay and Laure Watrin. Producer: CapaTV[12]. Length: 51'49. Date: 2008.

References

1971 births
Living people
French women writers
French journalists